Journal of New Music Research is a peer-reviewed academic journal covering research on musicology (including music theory), philosophy, psychology, acoustics, computer science, engineering, and other disciplines. Articles deal with theory, analysis, composition, performance, uses of music, instruments, and other music technologies. The journal was established in 1972 under the title Interface and is published by Routledge. The editor-in-chiefs are Johanna Devaney (Brooklyn College and the Graduate Center, CUNY) and David Meredith (Aalborg University).

Abstracting and indexing 
The journal is abstracted and indexed in:

According to the Journal Citation Reports, the journal has a 2011 impact factor of 0.481.

References

External links 
 

Taylor & Francis academic journals
English-language journals
Publications established in 1972
Quarterly journals
Music journals